Margravine Anna of Brandenburg (27 August 1487 – 3 May 1514) was a German noblewoman.

Margravine Anna was the daughter of John Cicero, Elector of Brandenburg and Margaret of Thuringia. She was born in Berlin, Brandenburg, and died in Kiel, Holstein.

Marriage 
In 1500 she was betrothed to Frederick, then Duke of Schleswig and Holstein and, after her death, king of Denmark and Norway.  Because they were second cousins (Frederick's mother Dorothea of Brandenburg was the cousin of Anna's father) their marriage required a Papal dispensation.  In addition, the marriage was not held until 10 April 1502 due to Anna's youth.  The marriage, held in Stendal, was a double one:  on the same day, Anna's brother Joachim and Frederick's niece Elisabeth were married.

Anna and Frederick had two children:
 Christian III of Denmark (12 August 1503 – 1 January 1559)
 Dorothea (1 August 1504 – 11 April 1547), married 1 July 1526 to Albert, Duke of Prussia

She died in 1514 at age 26.  Her husband was remarried, to Sophie of Pomerania, and had six more children.

Ancestry

References

External links 

1487 births
1514 deaths
People from Berlin
People from the Margraviate of Brandenburg
Anna
Anna
15th-century German women
16th-century German women
15th-century German people
16th-century German people
Daughters of monarchs